American River College (ARC) is a public community college in unincorporated Sacramento, California. It is part of the California Community Colleges System.

History 
The college was opened in 1955 as American River Junior College, on the site of the old Grant Technical College. It moved to its current location in 1958, occupying eight newly built office complexes and the original Cameron ranch house. In 1965 the college became a part of the Los Rios Community College District and became American River College. Today, along with Cosumnes River College, Folsom Lake College and Sacramento City College, ARC is directed by a seven-member board of trustees elected by voters residing in the district.

The climactic police showdown of the 1986 Emilio Estevez and Demi Moore film Wisdom was filmed on the American River campus, including in and around Beaver Stadium.

During the period of 2004–2013, the college opened a variety of new facilities, including buildings for Health Education, Theater & Music, Kinesiology, and Life Science and Fine Arts. In addition, the college also expanded its bookstore and library and opened a new Student Center and parking garage. In 2014 the college opened the 19,000 square foot Evangelisti Culinary Arts Center, which houses the college's hospitality management program and student-run Oak Cafe restaurant and bakery. In 2021 the college opened the 57,000 square foot Diane Bryant STEM Innovation Center, which houses a variety of academic programs.

In 2008 the student government supported California Proposition 8 which sought to restrict marriage to opposite-sex couples. In 2010 the Board of Trustees lost a lawsuit against the student government.

Campus 

The college occupies a  site on the old Cameron Ranch in northern Sacramento County.

Academics 
The college enrolls about 35,000 full-time and part-time students, making it one of the largest community colleges in California. ARC has published its own literary journal since 1984, the American River Review, which has won numerous national awards and recognitions, including the National Pacemaker Award from the Associated Collegiate Press and Gold Crowns from the Columbia Scholastic Press Association.

It transfers more students to UC Davis and CSU Sacramento than any other community college. Nontransfer students may enroll for certification in technical/vocational programs, continuing education credit, or personal enrichment. The college also offers three different types of online learning: online, hybrid, and web-enhanced.

Student life 
The campus has its own newspaper, the American River Current, and its own English as a Second Language newsletter, The Parrot.

Sport 
The college athletics teams are nicknamed the Beavers.

Notable people 

 Lloyd Connelly – California Superior Court judge and former California State Assembly member
 Ward Connerly – Former UC Regent and political activist
 Wally Herger – Member, United States House of Representatives (California, 2nd Congressional District)
 Ewa Klamt – German politician and Member of the European Parliament for Lower Saxony
 Adrian Lamo – Former grey-hat computer hacker, key figure in WikiLeaks case, journalist
 Joan Lunden – TV host/personality
 Brian Posehn – Comedian, co-star of The Sarah Silverman Program
 Anthony Padilla and Ian Hecox – Creators of Smosh.
 Anthony Swofford – Author of Jarhead
 Richard Trenton Chase – Serial killer

Notable sportspeople 
 Steve Andrade – pitcher for the Durham Bulls, an AAA Tampa Bay Devil Rays affiliate
 Dusty Baker – former Major League Baseball player and former manager of the San Francisco Giants, Chicago Cubs,  Cincinnati Reds and Washington Nationals
 Dallas Braden – former left-handed pitcher for the Oakland Athletics
 Jarrett Bush – defensive back for the Green Bay Packers
 Tony Eason – eight-year NFL quarterback for the New England Patriots and New York Jets. Started in Super Bowl XX
 Robert Hight – National Hot Rod Association Funny Car champion (2009). Father-in-law is 15-time NHRA Funny Car champion John Force.
 Steve Holm – catcher for the San Francisco Giants
 Mike Lincoln – pitcher for the Cincinnati Reds
 Don Lofgran – four-year forward for 4 different NBA teams
 Jim Loscutoff – nine-year forward for the Boston Celtics, where he played on 7 championship teams
 Debbie Meyer – three-time Olympic gold medalist swimmer at the 1968 Summer Olympics
 Bob Oliver – former Major League Baseball player
 Manny Parra – pitcher for the Cincinnati Reds
 John Vukovich – former Major League Baseball player and former manager of the Chicago Cubs and Philadelphia Phillies
 Gerald Willhite – seven-year NFL running back for the Denver Broncos
 Devontae Booker - NFL running back

References

External links 

 

 
California Community Colleges
Educational institutions established in 1955
Schools accredited by the Western Association of Schools and Colleges
Universities and colleges in Sacramento County, California
1955 establishments in California
Articles containing video clips